The Prix Iris for Best Animated Short Film is an annual film award presented by Québec Cinéma as part of its Prix Iris program, to honour the year's best animated short film made within the cinema of Quebec.

1990s

2000s

2010s

2020s

See also
Canadian Screen Award for Best Animated Short

References

Awards established in 2000
Quebec-related lists